Albert Allen Reiss (January 8, 1909 – May 13, 1989) was an American Major League Baseball shortstop. He played for the Philadelphia Athletics during the  season.

References

Major League Baseball shortstops
Philadelphia Athletics players
Baseball players from New Jersey
Sportspeople from Elizabeth, New Jersey
Allentown Brooks players
1909 births
1989 deaths